The 23rd Army Corps was an Army corps in the Imperial Russian Army.

Composition
3rd Guards Infantry Division
2nd Infantry Division

Part of
2nd Army: 1914
5th Army: 1914 – 1915
8th Army: 1915
1st Army: 1915
13th Army: 1915
3rd Army: 1915
5th Army: 1916
11th Army: 1916
8th Army: 1916
9th Army: 1916
8th Army: 1916 – 1917

Commanders
August 15, 1913 - August 30, 1914: Kyprian Kandratovich
August 30 - November 1914: Vladimir Danilov
December 28, 1914 - July 1, 1915: Vladimir Apollonovich Olokhov
September 1915: Nikolai Tretyakov
1916-1917: Eduard Ekk
April 1917: Mikhail Promtov
September 1917: Vasily Kirey

External links
 Russian Army, 1914
 23 Korpus Armijny na Regiment.ru 

Corps of the Russian Empire